David Keenan is an Irish songwriter and musician from Dundalk, County Louth. He is currently signed to Rubyworks Records.

Early life
David Keenan is an Irish songwriter and musician. Early life in the border town of Dundalk where he grew up between the family home and his grandparents house is where he first absorbed stories, music and poetry and nurtured a need to express himself. After failing most of his final year exams in secondary school and having spent time working in nightclubs and bars he decided to take the ferry from Ireland to Liverpool, busking by day, soaking up gigs by night the then still teenager developed a deeper sense of life experience and human nature, all of which went into a constant stream of new songs and writings. After a stint living in London resulted in a mugging and some creative frustrations he returned to Dublin with determination and began relentlessly playing live while releasing EP's through his own label Barrack Street Records. A musical tribe spanning two generations of Irish musicians grew around Keenan which led to the release of "Evidence of Living" in 2018 followed by tours in the run up to the recording of his debut album "A Beginner's Guide to Bravery" in 2019. In September 2019 Keenan signed with Irish Independent label Rubyworks Records " before the release of A Beginner's Guide To Bravery, which reached number 1 in the Independent charts and was the biggest selling Vinyl record in the country during the week of its release in January 2020. The release was marked by headlining Dublin's Olympia Theatre which later became the concert film and live album "Alchemy & Prose".

Musical Career, writing and influences
Shortly afterwards Keenan moved to Paris as artist in residence in the Centre Culturel Irlandais, where he wrote and later published a collection of Poems entitled "Soundings of an Unnamed Bird". It was also during this time of pre lockdown isolation and introspection that stirrings of a new album began to take hold and having returned to Ireland once again, plans were put in place to record what later became his second studio album "WHAT THEN?" with American musician / producer Jonathan Mooney (Other Lives) in Black Mountain studios, just outside his hometown of Dundalk. "WHAT THEN"? was released in October of '21 to critical acclaim and is widely considered a maturing record where Keenan grew both lyrically and musically. Keenan has toured extensively across the UK, Europe, North America and his native Ireland, building a reputation for incredible, personable, live performances where nothing is left behind. He has lived in Barcelona since 2021.

Keenan states that he was mainly influenced by Writers, Poets, Painters & Musicians such as Brendan Behan, Robert Tressell, Merce Rodoreda, Arthur Rimbaud, Ema Berta, Jack B. Yeats, Hieronymous Bosch, Nick Cave, Billie Holiday, The La's and The Dubliners.

Keenan released four EPs on his own label, Barrack Street Records, named after a place in his hometown Dundalk, including Cobwebs, Strip Me Bare, Strip Me Bare Vol. 2, and Evidence of Living.

Keenan recorded his debut album, A Beginner's Guide to Bravery, in Hellfire Studios on the outskirts of Dublin over the course of seven days. It was released on 10 January 2020, debuting at number 1 in the Irish Independent Albums Charts. A Beginner's Guide to Bravery became the biggest selling vinyl album during its week of release. Keenan's debut was described as "a remarkable record" by NPR, "Thrilling" by Sunday Times and "A marvellous album, and a labour of love" by The Irish Independent. Keenan played a sold out Olympia Theatre in Dublin the week of the album release, captured on film it would later become concert film and live album "Alchemy & Prose". Keenan published his first collection of poetry "Soundings of an Unnamed Bird" in 2020

Keenan released his second album, What Then?, on 15 October 2021. The first single from the album, "Bark", was released on 10 June 2021, followed by "Sentimental Dole" on 16 July, "What Then Cried Jo Soap" on 19 August of the same year. To promote the album, Keenan toured the United States with Rodrigo y Gabriela in September 2021.

Discography

Studio albums

Extended plays

References 

Year of birth missing (living people)
Living people
Irish male singer-songwriters